Hassan Rouhani, a moderate Iranian politician and former Secretary of the Supreme National Security Council, also known as the Diplomat Sheikh, launched his presidential campaign in March 2013. He was earlier expected to withdraw and endorse Ali Akbar Hashemi Rafsanjani after he registered, but he returned to the race after Hashemi's disqualification. The symbol of Rouhani's campaign was a key and his slogan was "Government of Prudence and Hope." On 15 June, he was elected as the president with 18,613,329 votes.

Campaign staff and policy team 
Mohammadreza Nematzadeh, Campaign chair. Minister of Industries (1989–1997)
Akbar Torkan, Campaign vice chair. Minister of Defense (1989–1993) and Minister of Transportation (1993–1997)
 Mahmoud Vaezi, Foreign affairs committee chair, Deputy Minister of Foreign Affairs (1990–1997)
Ali Younesi, Religions committee chair. Minister of Intelligence (2000–2005)
Mohammad Bagher Nobakht, Campaign spokesman. Member of the Parliament (1988–2004)
Yasser Hashemi Rafsanjani, Advisor.

Policies 

Rouhani questioned the formal policy of the government about different issues.

Economy 
Rouhani considers the existing problems in the field of economy and other sectors due to incorrect management by the incumbent administration. He admitted with proper planning, production units can be activated and jobs can be created, but this needs stability because sometimes economic regulations of the country have changed 50 times in a single month.

Nuclear program 

Rohani defended his track record as Iran's chief nuclear negotiator from October 2003 to August 2005. He said he moved war, sanctions, and the UN Security Council (resolutions) away from Iran. About his view on nuclear program and its relationship with economical problems due to sanctions he said:

Rouhani has pledged more transparency about what he says is Iran's peaceful nuclear enrichment program, aimed at producing fuel for nuclear reactors to generate electricity. He told Alsharq Alawsat:

Diplomacy with the United States 
Hassan Rouhani promised more effective diplomacy with the West. Rouhani said, in Asharq Al-Awsat:

Treatment of Political Prisoners 

Rouhani has promised to attempt to heal the severe rift between Green Movement liberals and Khomeinist hard liners by getting Mir-Hossein Mousavi and Mehdi Karroubi, leaders of the 2009 protest movement, released from house arrest. He said
"I was Iran’s national Security Advisor for sixteen years during the administrations of Rafsanjani and Khatami. Therefore, I know how to deal with sensitive issues. If elected, I will do my best to secure the release of those who have been incarcerated following the regrettable events of 2009. I know that the constitutional powers of the president in Iran do not extend to the areas outside the realm of the executive branch of the system. However, I am quite optimistic that I can muster the necessary domestic consensus to improve the present situation of Mr. Mousavi and Mr. Karrubi."

Disqualification rumors 
As Mehr news agency reported Rouhani might get disqualified prior to the upcoming presidential elections. The news agency announced that an anonymous source had told it that the reasoning of a possible disqualification was the disclosure of confidential information related to Iran's nuclear program during the televised debates. Another reason for a possible disqualification of Rouhani was the slogans that his supporters chanted, according to the source. The disqualification was thereafter denied by the Guardian Council.

Consensus of Reformists for Rouhani 

Three days before the presidential election, Iranian moderates and reformists coalesced behind Hassan Rouhani; Including Akbar Hashemi Rafsanjani, Mohammad Khatami and Molavi Abdul Hamid. This Consensus happened after the withdrawal of the only reformist candidate Mohammad Reza Aref. Aref withdrew on the advice of Mohammad Khatami so the electorate would all stand behind Rouhani, so there wouldn't be a split in the vote between the two
and to greatly limit the chance of a conservative victory. This showed that the moderates and reformists had united together and had thrown all their support behind Rouhani, which the conservatives failed to do with a single conservative candidate.

Observers views on candidacy 

Nader Hashemi, director of the Center for Middle East Studies at the University of Denver:

Farideh Farhi, Iran expert at the University of Hawaii:

Endorsements

 Moderation and Development Party
 Association of Combatant Clerics
 Islamic Iran Participation Front
 Coordination Council for the Reformist Front
 Assembly of Qom Seminary Scholars and Researchers
 Executives of Construction Party
 Freedom Movement
 Labour Coalition
 Democracy Party
 Nationalist-Religious movement
 Iranian Call and Reform Organization

 Mohammad Khatami
 Akbar Hashemi Rafsanjani
 Ali Motahari
 Ahmad Montazeri
 Mohsen Hashemi Rafsanjani
 Yousef Saanei
 Mohammad-Reza Aref
 Hassan Khomeini
 Hadi Khamenei
 Gholamhossein Karbaschi
 Mostafa Malekian
 Mostafa Tajzadeh
 Mostafa Moin
 Ali Akbar Nategh Nouri
 Asadollah Bayat-Zanjani
 Mohammad-Reza Khatami
 Ali Mohammad Dastgheib Shirazi
 Mohammad Shariatmadari
 Pegah Ahangarani
 Abdolhossein Mokhtabad
 Bahareh Rahnama
 Jafar Towfighi
 Peyman Ghasem Khani
 Shahram Nazeri
 Elaheh Koulaei
 Masoumeh Ebtekar
 Ghodratollah Alikhani
 Hassan Ghafourifard
 Eshaq Jahangiri
 Mostafa Moeen
 Ahmad Khorram
 Behdad Salimi
 Sahar Dolatshahi
 Amir Jafari
 Reza Kianian
 Mostafa Tajzadeh
 Tannaz Tabatabaei
 Masoud Jafari Jozani
 Leyli Rashidi
 Arya Aramnejad
 Arash Sadeghi
 Mohsen Mirdamadi
 Majid Barzegar
 Saeed Laylaz
 Hesameddin Seraj
 Mohammad Sattarifar
 Abbas Abdi
 Habibollah Peyman
 Mohsen Safaei Farahani
 Abdollah Ramezanzadeh

See also 
 Hassan Rouhani presidential campaign, 2017
 Akbar Hashemi Rafsanjani presidential campaign, 2013

References

External links 
 Official campaign website 

2013 Iranian presidential election
Presidency of Hassan Rouhani
Election campaigns in Iran